Wilhelm Lemke (born December 1884, date of death unknown) was a German gymnast. He competed in three events at the 1904 Summer Olympics.

References

1884 births
Year of death missing
German male artistic gymnasts
Olympic gymnasts of Germany
Gymnasts at the 1904 Summer Olympics
Place of birth missing